Volmunster (Lorraine Franconian: Wolminschter) is a commune in the Moselle department of the Grand Est administrative region in north-eastern France.

The village belongs to the Pays de Bitche and to the Northern Vosges Regional Nature Park.

Localities of the commune: Eschviller, Weiskirch.

See also
 Communes of the Moselle department

References

External links
 

Communes of Moselle (department)